Brackley was a parliamentary borough in Northamptonshire, which elected two Members of Parliament (MPs) to the House of Commons from 1547 until 1832, when the constituency was abolished by the Great Reform Act.

History
The borough consisted of the town of Brackley, a market town where the main economic interests were making lace and footwear. In 1831, the population of the borough was 2,107, and the town contained 378 houses. While this by no means put it among the smallest of the rotten boroughs, it was barely the half the size which was eventually required to retain representation after 1832.

Brackley was a corporation borough, the right to vote having been restricted to the Mayor, 6 aldermen and 26 "burgesses" (the remaining members of the corporation), a total electorate of 33, in the reign of James II. The Mayor was appointed by the Lord of the Manor, and the major local landowners or "patrons" had total control over the election of MPs. In the mid 18th century the Duke of Bridgewater was able to nominate both MPs; by the time of the Reform Act, the Earl of Bridgewater nominated to one seat and the Marquess of Stafford to the other.

Brackley lost both its MPs under the provisions of the Reform Act.

Members of Parliament

1547–1640

1640–1832

Notes

References 
 Robert Beatson, A Chronological Register of Both Houses of Parliament (London: Longman, Hurst, Res & Orme, 1807) 
 D Brunton & D H Pennington, Members of the Long Parliament (London: George Allen & Unwin, 1954)
 Cobbett's Parliamentary history of England, from the Norman Conquest in 1066 to the year 1803 (London: Thomas Hansard, 1808) 
 J Holladay Philbin, Parliamentary Representation 1832 – England and Wales (New Haven: Yale University Press, 1965)

Parliamentary constituencies in Northamptonshire (historic)
Constituencies of the Parliament of the United Kingdom established in 1547
Constituencies of the Parliament of the United Kingdom disestablished in 1832
Rotten boroughs
Brackley